The discography of UK dance-pop group Steps, contains seven studio albums, seven compilation albums and thirty singles.

Steps' debut single, "5,6,7,8" was released in 1997 and reached number fourteen on the UK Singles Chart and the track remains one of the highest selling singles never to reach the top 10 on the UK chart. Second single "Last Thing on My Mind" became their first UK top ten peaking at number six. "One for Sorrow", the next single, peaked at number two and was followed by their debut album, Step One, which debuted and peaked at number two on the UK Albums Chart and went on to become certified 5× Platinum by the British Phonographic Industry (BPI). The next single release was a double A-side "Heartbeat"/"Tragedy" released in November 1998 and peaked at number one in January 1999. The success of "Heartbeat"/"Tragedy" led to the release of the group's next single, "Better Best Forgotten" to be delayed by almost two months, but then peaked at number two. In July 1999, Steps released the first single from their next album, "Love's Got a Hold on My Heart" which was another number two hit in the UK. The group then released their second album, Steptacular, which peaked at number one and was eventually certified 4× Platinum. The group's follow-up singles "After the Love Has Gone", "Say You'll Be Mine"/"Better the Devil You Know", "Deeper Shade of Blue" and "When I Said Goodbye"/"Summer of Love" continued their top five run. In October 2000, Steps released their third album Buzz, reaching number 4 in the UK charts and being certified double platinum. Its lead single was "Stomp", their second number one single. The following single "It's the Way You Make Me Feel", reached number two and "Here and Now"/"You'll Be Sorry" peaked at number four.

The group then released a greatest hits album in 2001. "Chain Reaction", a cover of the popular Diana Ross song, was released as the first single from Gold: Greatest Hits and was another UK number two. The second single, "Words Are Not Enough"/"I Know Him So Well", was another top five hit and became the final single from the group. They announced their split on Boxing Day 2001. The group's record company, Jive Records released a remix and B-side compilation in 2002, The Last Dance, which featured remixes of previous tracks. This album peaked at number fifty-seven in the UK. Steps reformed in May 2011 and released The Ultimate Collection in October. It debuted at number one in the UK. A box set, The Platinum Collection was set to be released on 28 November 2011; however, it was postponed to 13 February 2012. On 30 April 2012, The Ultimate Collection: Tour Edition was released. It features two discs, with the additional disc featuring the songs in karaoke style. All the songs apart from "Chain Reaction" and "I Know Him So Well" feature a backing track sung by Faye, Lisa, Claire, H and Lee. Also in April, a live album called Steps: Live! 2012 was released as part of the group's 2012 tour. It was only available to purchase at venues where the group performed. All of the songs performed are on the live album. The official video for "Light Up the World" is the Lyric Video. The group reformed on 1 January 2017 and released their fifth album Tears on the Dancefloor on 21 April 2017, which debuted and peaked at number two on the UK Albums Chart. "Scared of the Dark" was released as the first single and peaked at number thirty-seven.

Steps' sixth studio album What the Future Holds was released on 27 November 2020. It was preceded by two singles. The band released their seventh studio album quickly in September 2021, What the Future Holds Pt. 2. Both studio albums debuted at number 2 in the UK charts. In May 2022, it was announced that Steps would be releasing their third greatest hits compilation, titled Platinum Collection. The album was released on 19 August 2022.

Albums

Studio albums

Compilation albums

Box set

Live albums

Remix albums

Reissues

Extended plays

Singles

As featured artist

Other charted songs

Video albums

Music videos

Other appearances

References

Notes

Citations

Discographies of British artists
Pop music group discographies
Discography